Slobozia Solar Park is a large thin-film photovoltaic (PV) power system, built on a  plot of land located in Slobozia in Romania. The solar park has around 180,000 state-of-the-art thin film PV panels for a total nameplate capacity of 45-megawatts, and was finished in September 2013. The solar park is expected to supply around 63 GWh of electricity per year enough to power some 69,000 average homes.

The installation is located in the Giurgiu County in southern Romania in Slobozia. The investment cost for the Slobozia solar park amounts to some Euro 100 million.

See also

Energy policy of the European Union
Photovoltaics
Renewable energy commercialization
Renewable energy in the European Union
Solar power in Romania

References

Photovoltaic power stations in Romania